The 1629 Banda Sea earthquake struck the Banda Sea, Indonesia on August 1. Its epicentre is believed to have been in the Seram Trough. A megathrust earthquake caused a  tsunami, which was recorded to have affected the Banda Islands about 30 minutes after the quake. Many trees in the Banda Islands were reported to have been uprooted.

See also
List of earthquakes in Indonesia
List of historical earthquakes
1852 Banda Sea earthquake

References

Further reading
 

1629 earthquakes
Megathrust earthquakes in Indonesia
Banda Islands
1629 in Southeast Asia